The International Society of Hymenopterists focuses on the study of the insect order of Hymenoptera. It was founded in 1982.

Journal
Since 1992, the society publishes the Journal of Hymenoptera Research. The editor-in-chief is Stefan Schmidt.

References

External links
 

Entomological societies
International learned societies